Kaushik Roy  is an Indian politician from BJP. In May 2021, he was elected as the member of the West Bengal Legislative Assembly from Maynaguri.

Career
Roy is from Maynaguri, Jalpaiguri district. His father's name is Nayan Chandra Roy. He passed Higher Secondary from West Bengal Council of Higher Secondary Education Year 2001 and D.El.Ed West Bengal Board of Primary Education Year 2015. He contested in 2021 West Bengal Legislative Assembly election from Maynaguri Vidhan Sabha and won the seat on 2 May 2021.

References 

Living people
Year of birth missing (living people)
21st-century Indian politicians
People from Jalpaiguri district
Bharatiya Janata Party politicians from West Bengal
West Bengal MLAs 2021–2026
Members of the West Bengal Legislative Assembly